Neumann lines, or Neumann bands, are fine patterns of parallel lines seen in cross-sections of many hexahedrite iron meteorites in the kamacite phase, although they may appear also in octahedrites provided the kamacite phase is about 30 micrometres wide. They can be seen after a polished meteorite cross-section is treated with acid. The lines are indicative of a shock-induced deformation of the kamacite crystal, and are thought to be due to impact events on the parent body of the meteorite. 

The lines are named after Johann G. Neumann, who discovered them in 1848 in the iron meteorite Braunau, a hexahedrite, which fell in 1847.

See also
 Glossary of meteoritics
Widmanstätten pattern

References

Meteorite mineralogy and petrology